Nenno may refer to:

Places
 Nenno, Wisconsin, an unincorporated community located in the town of Addison, Washington County, Wisconsin
 Nenno, a village in Valbrevenna comune in Italy

Surnames
 Eric Nenno (1961–2008), a convicted and executed child killer